Zusidava sinuosa is a moth in the family Drepanidae. It was described by Frederic Moore in 1888. It is found in the Khasi Hills of India. The Global Lepidoptera Names Index has this name as a synonym of Zusidava tortricaria.

References

Moths described in 1888
Drepaninae
Moths of Asia
Taxa named by Frederic Moore